Belfast is a 2021 British and Irish coming-of-age comedy-drama film written and directed by Kenneth Branagh. The film stars Caitríona Balfe, Judi Dench, Jamie Dornan, Ciarán Hinds, Colin Morgan, and newcomer Jude Hill. The film, which Branagh has described as his "most personal film", centers on a young boy's childhood amidst the tumult of Belfast, Northern Ireland, in the 1960s.

Belfast had its world premiere at the 48th Telluride Film Festival on 2 September 2021, and also won the People's Choice Award at the 2021 Toronto International Film Festival. The film was released in the United States on 12 November 2021 by Focus Features, and in the United Kingdom and Ireland on 21 January 2022, by Universal Pictures. It received positive reviews from critics and has, so far, grossed over $15.7 million, worldwide.

It received seven nominations at the 94th Academy Awards, including Best Picture, and was named one of the best films of 2021 by the National Board of Review. It tied with The Power of the Dog for a leading seven nominations at the 79th Golden Globe Awards, including Best Motion Picture – Drama; the film won a Golden Globe for Best Screenplay. It also tied with Steven Spielberg's West Side Story for a leading eleven nominations at the 27th Critics' Choice Awards, winning Best Ensemble Cast and Best Original Screenplay. The movie received six nominations at the 75th British Academy Film Awards, winning Outstanding British Film. Branagh became the first individual to have been nominated in a total of seven different categories with his nominations in the Best Picture and Best Original Screenplay categories for his work on the film. At the age of 87, Judi Dench became the second oldest nominee in the category of Best Supporting Actress for her performance, after Gloria Stuart was nominated in the same category for her role in Titanic (1997), also at 87 years old but a few months older than Dench.

Accolades

See also 
2021 in film

Notes

References

External links
 

Lists of accolades by film